Cherokee County is a county located in the U.S. state of Iowa. As of the 2020 census, the population was 11,658. The county seat is Cherokee. The county was formed on January 15, 1851, from open territory. It was named after the Cherokee people.

Geography

Major highways
 U.S. Highway 59
 Iowa Highway 3
 Iowa Highway 7
 Iowa Highway 31
 Iowa Highway 143

Adjacent counties
O'Brien County  (north)
Buena Vista County  (east)
Ida County  (south)
Woodbury County  (southwest)
Plymouth County  (west)

Demographics

2020 census
There were 5,558 housing units of which 5,008 were occupied.

2010 census
There were 5,777 housing units, of which 5,207 were occupied.

2000 census
	
As of the census of 2000, there were 13,035 people, 5,378 households, and 3,597 families residing in the county.  The population density was 23 people per square mile (9/km2).  There were 5,850 housing units at an average density of 10 per square mile (4/km2).  The racial makeup of the county was 98.33% White, 0.31% Black or African American, 0.16% Native American, 0.43% Asian, 0.37% from other races, and 0.40% from two or more races.  0.95% of the population were Hispanic or Latino of any race.

There were 5,378 households, out of which 29.10% had children under the age of 18 living with them, 57.30% were married couples living together, 6.50% had a female householder with no husband present, and 33.10% were non-families. 29.50% of all households were made up of individuals, and 15.30% had someone living alone who was 65 years of age or older.  The average household size was 2.35 and the average family size was 2.91.

In the county, the population was spread out, with 24.60% under the age of 18, 6.80% from 18 to 24, 24.00% from 25 to 44, 24.30% from 45 to 64, and 20.40% who were 65 years of age or older.  The median age was 42 years. For every 100 females there were 97.40 males.  For every 100 females age 18 and over, there were 92.70 males.

The median income for a household in the county was $35,142, and the median income for a family was $42,897. Males had a median income of $29,612 versus $21,181 for females. The per capita income for the county was $17,934.  About 5.50% of families and 7.30% of the population were below the poverty line, including 9.70% of those under age 18 and 5.70% of those age 65 or over.

Communities

Cities

Aurelia
Cherokee
Cleghorn
Larrabee
Marcus
Meriden
Quimby
Washta

Townships
Cherokee County is divided into sixteen townships:

 Afton
 Amherst
 Cedar
 Cherokee
 Diamond
 Grand Meadow
 Liberty
 Marcus
 Pilot
 Pitcher
 Rock
 Sheridan
 Silver
 Spring
 Tilden
 Willow

Population ranking
The population ranking of the following table is based on the 2020 census of Cherokee County.

† county seat

Politics

See also

National Register of Historic Places listings in Cherokee County, Iowa

References

 
Iowa placenames of Native American origin
1851 establishments in Iowa
Populated places established in 1851